Armenia participated in the Eurovision Song Contest 2007 with the song "Anytime You Need" written by Hayko and Karen Kavaleryan. The song was performed by Hayko. The Armenian entry for the 2007 contest in Helsinki, Finland was selected through the national final Evrotesil 2007, organised by the Armenian broadcaster Public Television of Armenia (AMPTV). The national final and consisted of three shows: two semi-finals and a final. Ten entries competed in each semi-final with three from each semi-final alongside a wildcard qualifying to compete in the final on 25 February 2007. "Anytime You Need" performed by Hayko was selected by a professional jury as the winner.

As one of the ten highest placed finishers in 2006, Armenia automatically qualified to compete in the final of the Eurovision Song Contest. Performing during the show in position 23, Armenia placed eighth out of the 24 participating countries with 138 points.

Background

The Armenian national broadcaster, Public Television of Armenia (AMPTV), broadcasts the event within Armenia and organises the selection process for the nation's entry. AMPTV confirmed their intentions to participate at the 2007 Eurovision Song Contest on 25 October 2006. In 2006, the broadcaster internally selected both the artist and the song. However, AMPTV announced along with their participation confirmation that a national final would be organized to select for the 2007 Armenian entry.

Before Eurovision

Evrotesil 2007 
Evrotesil 2007 was the national final that selected the Armenian entry for the Eurovision Song Contest 2007. The competition commenced on 23 February 2007 with the first of two semi-finals and concluded with a winning song and artist during the final on 25 February 2007. All shows in the competition took place at the AMPTV studios in Yerevan, hosted by Gohar Gasparyan and Armenian Eurovision 2006 entrant André and broadcast on Channel 1.

Format 
The national final took place over three stages and consisted of three shows. The first stage was a submission period where artists and songwriters had the opportunity to apply by submitting their entries online. Twenty entries were selected to proceed to the second stage of the competition. The second stage consisted of the semi-finals which took place on 23 and 24 February 2007 with ten entries competing in each show, from which three proceeded to the final from each semi-final. The broadcaster also reserved the right to select a wildcard act to proceed to the final out of the non-qualifying entries from both semi-finals. The third stage was the final which took place on 25 February 2007, during which the winner was selected from the remaining entries. 

The results of the semi-finals were determined by a professional jury panel and a public vote. The jury first selected two songs to advance and the third qualifier was selected by the public vote from the remaining eight entries. In the final, the winner was selected exclusively by a professional jury panel. The public were able to cast their votes via SMS during each of the three shows, however their results were not considered in the final.

Competing entries 
AMPTV announced a submission period with a deadline of 31 November 2006. Artists were required to be of Armenian citizenship, while songwriters worldwide were able to submit songs. From all entries received at the closing of the deadline, twenty entries proceeded to the national final which were announced on 15 February 2007.

Shows

Semi-final 1 
The first semi-final took place on 23 February 2007. Ten entries competed and three qualified to the final. A professional jury first selected two songs to advance, with an additional qualifier selected from the remaining eight entries by a public vote: "Colour of My Tears" performed by Arina Hovhannisyan.

Semi-final 2 
The second semi-final took place on 24 February 2007. Ten entries competed and three qualified to the final. A professional jury first selected two songs to advance, with an additional qualifier selected from the remaining eight entries by a public vote. A further entry was also announced during the show to have also qualified to the final as the wildcard.

Final 
The final took place on 25 February 2007. The seven entries that qualified from the preceding two semi-finals competed and the winner, "Anytime You Need" performed by Hayko, was selected by a professional jury. A public vote also took place during the show with "Anytime You Need" performed by Hayko also receiving the most votes.

At Eurovision
All countries except the "Big 4" (France, Germany, Spain and the United Kingdom), the host country, and the ten highest placed finishers in the 2006 contest are required to qualify from the semi-final in order to compete for the final; the top ten countries from the semi-final progress to the final. As one of the ten highest placed finishers in the 2006 contest, Armenia automatically qualified to compete in the final on 12 May 2007. In addition to their participation in the final, Armenia is also required to broadcast and vote in the semi-final on 10 May 2007. On 12 March 2007, a special allocation draw was held which determined the running order and Armenia was set to perform in position 23 during the final, following the entry from Turkey and before the entry from Moldova.

In Armenia, both the semi-final and the final were broadcast on Channel 1 with commentary by Gohar Gasparyan. The Armenian spokesperson, who announced the Armenian votes during the final, was Sirusho.

Final 

Hayko took part in technical rehearsals on 8 and 9 May, followed by dress rehearsals on 11 and 12 May. The Armenian performance featured Hayko dressed in a white shirt and black trousers performing on stage together with two backing vocalists, a drummer and a flautist. The stage presentation included a red leafless tree with its branches tied with white ribbons, smoke effects at the beginning of the performance as well as the use of a wind machine throughout the performance. A bloodstain also appeared on Hayko's shirt as the song progressed. The LED screens projected snowflakes rushing through red trees that formed large heart symbols at all sides and the stage lighting displayed white colours. The stage director and choreographer for the Armenian performance was Andrey Sychov. The backing vocalists that joined Hayko on stage were Goga and Tigran Petrosyan, the drummer was Ara Torosyan, and the flautist was Arthur. Armenia placed eighth in the final, scoring 138 points.

Voting 
Below is a breakdown of points awarded to Armenia and awarded by Armenia in the semi-final and grand final of the contest. The nation awarded its 12 points to Belarus in the semi-final and to Russia in the final of the contest.

Points awarded to Armenia

Points awarded by Armenia

References 

2007
Countries in the Eurovision Song Contest 2007
Eurovision